The Jamaican monarch (Danaus cleophile) is a species of milkweed butterfly in the nymphalid Danainae subfamily. It is found in the Dominican Republic, Haiti, and Jamaica.
Differences between the populations of Danaus arise from the two regions they have been reported to have been frequently seen in Jamaica and  Hispaniola; Haiti and the Dominican Republic. The subspecies found in Jamaica are smaller, darker in pigmentation, and possess various infinitesimal but accordant wing pattern characteristics. It is now newly founded and described as the Danaus cleophile jamaicensis.

Description

Holotype Male:

Dorsal Forewing
The dorsal forewing of the holotype male has an orange-brown color with black veins, a black apex, and a wide black outer edge. The costa's base is gray, with one pale yellow dash running in the middle between the costa and subcosta, two pale yellow dashes above the cell's end, followed by a post-discal pair, and one pale yellow dash close to the apex. The tornus is where the inner row of 10 light yellow dots and the outer row of eleven spots along the outer edge converge.

See also
 Monarch butterfly

References 

Danaus (butterfly)
Butterflies of the Caribbean
Butterflies of Jamaica
Insects of the Dominican Republic
Insects of Haiti
Fauna of Hispaniola
Butterflies described in 1819
Near threatened fauna of North America
Taxonomy articles created by Polbot
Taxa named by Jean-Baptiste Godart